Yu Changchun (also (Yu Chang-chun), (born 1941) is a male Chinese former international table tennis player.

He won a bronze medal at the 1965 World Table Tennis Championships in the men's doubles with Zhou Lansun and a silver medal at the 1973 World Table Tennis Championships in the mixed doubles with Zheng Huaiying.

See also
 List of table tennis players
 List of World Table Tennis Championships medalists

References

Chinese male table tennis players
Living people
Table tennis players from Shanghai
1941 births
World Table Tennis Championships medalists